EUYMO – Yellow Magic Orchestra Live in London + Gijón 2008 is a live album compilation by Yellow Magic Orchestra. It collects two live double-disc YMO albums, LONDONYMO - Yellow Magic Orchestra Live in London 15/6 08 and GIJÓNYMO – Yellow Magic Orchestra Live in Gijón 19/6 08 (and also comes with a tour T-shirt). It is performed in the style that the group built up as Sketch Show and as HASYMO. Unlike all other YMO live albums, these only have three songs from YMO albums (one from BGM, one from Naughty Boys and one from Service, as well as a song that YMO performed live but was not included in any of their albums). Most of the songs played are Sketch Show/HASYMO material (three songs from Audio Sponge, four from Loophole and the "Rescue / Rydeen 79/07" & "The City of Light / Tokyo Town Pages" singles), as well as songs from the individual members' solo careers (one from Hosono's Philharmony and one song each from Sakamoto's B-2 Unit, Illustrated Musical Encyclopedia and Chasm albums). Two tracks are performed in the way they were on the "Tribute to Haruomi Hosono" album (Hosono's "Sports Men" and Sketch Show's "Turn Turn"). Both albums are very similar, with the main distinction between them being GIJÓNYMO having its songs on a different order, fewer songs, and "Riot in Lagos" being performed differently.

Track listing

LONDONYMO – Yellow Magic Orchestra Live in London 15/6 08

GIJÓNYMO – Yellow Magic Orchestra Live in Gijón 19/6 08

Personnel
Haruomi Hosono - Bass, Keyboards, Vocals, Production
Ryuichi Sakamoto - Keyboards, Vocals, Production, Mixing
Yukihiro Takahashi - Drums, Percussion, Vocals, Production
Christian Fennesz - Guitar, Electronics
Ren Takada - Steel guitar, Electronics
Tomohiko Gondo - Computer Operation, Euphonium
Adam Brown - Recording
Fernando Aponte - Mixing
Shigeo "MT" Miyamoto - Mastering
Shoko Ise - Visuals
Rama Lee - Photography
Giles Dunn - Art Direction, Graphic Design, T-shirt Design
Jens Janson - Graphic Design

External links

Yellow Magic Orchestra albums
2008 live albums